"Soy Mujer" is a Latin pop song recorded by American duo Ha*Ash. It was first included on Ha*Ash's first studio album "Ha*Ash" (2003) where it was released as the fourth single and then included on their live album Primera Fila: Hecho Realidad (2014).

Background and release 
"Soy Mujer" was written by Áureo Baqueiro. It serves as the opening track to her first studio album Ha*Ash (2003), and then recorded live for his live album Primera Fila: Hecho Realidad (2014).

On April, 2004, the track was re-released as a digital download as the promotional single for Ha*Ash. The track "Si Pruebas una Vez", which also appeared on the parent album, were also released digitally.

Commercial performance 
The track peaked at number 7 in the Monitor Latino charts in the Mexico.

Music video 
A music video for "Soy Mujer" for his live album Primera Fila: Hecho Realidad (2014) was released on April 20, 2015. It was directed by Nahuel Lerena. The video was filmed in Estudios Churubusco, City Mexico. , the video has over 31 million views on YouTube.

Credits and personnel 
Credits adapted from AllMusic and Genius.

Recording and management

 Recording Country: México
 Sony / ATV Discos Music Publishing LLC / Westwood Publishing
 (P) 2003 Sony Music Entertainment México, S.A. De C.V. (studio version)
 (P) 2014 Sony Music Entertainment México, S.A. De C.V. (live version)

Ha*Ash
 Ashley Grace  – vocals, guitar, songwriting (studio version / live version)
 Hanna Nicole  – vocals, guitar, songwriting (studio version / live version)
Additional personnel
 Áureo Baqueiro  – songwriting, recording engineer, arranger, director (studio version)
 Armando Ávila  – guitar, acoustic guitar, recording engineer (studio version)
 Michelle Batrez  – cornet (studio version)
 Rodolfo Cruz  – recording engineer (studio version)
 Áureo Baqueiro  – songwriting (live version)
 Pablo De La Loza  – co-producer, co-director (live version)
 George Noriega  – producer (live version)
 Tim Mitchell  – producer (live version)

Charts

Release history

References 

Ha*Ash songs
Songs written by Áureo Baqueiro
Song recordings produced by Áureo Baqueiro
2004 songs
2004 singles
Spanish-language songs
Pop ballads
Sony Music Latin singles
2000s ballads